Acceleration is the first full-length album by Norwegian avant-garde progressive metal band Age of Silence. It was released on September 14, 2004.

Track listing
 "Auditorium of Modern Movements" (Winter, Lazare) – 3:36
 "Acceleration" (Winter, Lazare) – 4:30
 "The Concept of Hate" (Winter, Lazare) – 4:09
 "A Song for D. Incorporated" (Winter, Lazare) – 4:58
 "The Green Office and the Dark Desk Drawer" (Winter, Lazare) – 4:17
 "The Flow at 9:30 am" (Winter, Lazare) – 6:25
 "Of Concrete and Glass" (Winter, Lazare) – 3:14
 "90° Angles" (Extant, Lazare) – 7:19
 "I No Longer Know If I Am Mad" (Extant, Kobbergaard) – 2:28
 "Synthetic, Fabricated, Calculated" (Extant, Lazare) – 4:11

Personnel
Lars Are "Lazare" Nedland – vocals
Jan Axel "Hellhammer" Blomberg – drums
Lars Eikind "Si" – bass, backing vocals
Joacim "Extant" Solheim – guitar
Helge "Kobbergaard" Haugen – guitar, vocals on “I No Longer Know If I Am Mad”
Andy Winter – keyboards

References

Age of Silence albums
2004 debut albums
The End Records albums
Albums with cover art by Travis Smith (artist)